The Madison Capitols are a Tier I junior ice hockey team that plays in the Eastern Conference of the United States Hockey League. Founded in 2014, the team plays its home games at Bob Suter's Capitol Ice Arena in Middleton, Wisconsin.

History

Early history (1984–1991) 
The Madison Capitols began as a team in 1984, competing in the USHL, and played for 11 consecutive seasons. During this period, the Capitols played home games at the Hartmeyer Ice Arena, posting a 207–278–16 record, playing a total of 530 games.

The team was coached by Bob Suter from 1984 to 1986, posting a 35–48–3–10 record. Following what was a mild start to the franchise, Scott Owens took over coaching duties in 1986 and started a winning franchise, posting a 136–85–9–10 record through 1991. Owens would then move on to coach the Des Moines Buccaneers and Colorado College, ending the first era of the Madison Capitols.

Wisconsin Capitols (1991–1995) 
With the departure of Owens, the Madison Capitols re-branded themselves as the Wisconsin Capitols in 1991. Steve Huglen, a University of Illinois Defensemen, was hired as head coach for the 1991–1992 campaign and the Capitols intended to continue their winning record; however, under Huglen the team posted an 11–37–0 season.

The 1992–93 campaign saw the departure of Huglen, and the addition of Mike Dibble as head coach. After the team posted a 2–21–2 record Dibble was replaced by Rob Andriga mid-season, who would coach the Capitols to a 4–19–1 record, finishing at 6–39–2–1 season record.

In the 1993–94 season, Andringa was still coaching the Wisconsin Capitols, along with the additions of Don Granato, and Brian Duffy. The Capitols would post a 9–37–1–3 record this season, second to their worst. The era of the Wisconsin Capitols and, for the time being, USHL hockey in Madison was close to an end.

The final season of the Capitols in Madison in 1994–95, saw the return of Duffy, who would post a 3–8–0 record as head coach. The replacement coach, Len Semplice would finish the season with a 7–29–1 record, totaling a team season record of 10–37–1.

Madison Capitols (2014–present) 
On November 26, 2013, the management of Madtown Hockey, LLC announced that the Madison Capitols would be returning to Madison in the 2014–15 season. Ryan Suter, defenseman for the Minnesota Wild and Tom Sagissor, a former Wisconsin Badger, would join the ownership group. It was also announced that the Madison Capitols would play at the Alliant Energy Center in Madison, Wisconsin.

On May 22, 2014, Luke Strand was formally introduced as the Madison Capitols head coach and general manager. He was joined on the bench by fellow Eau Claire native Keith Paulsen and longtime NHL veteran and Stanley Cup Champion Tony Hrkac.

Following Bob Suter's death in September 2014, the Capitols honored the lifelong Madison native and gold medalist with stickers on team helmets, a banner bearing his jersey number 20 inside the Coliseum, and the ice rink named in his honor (Bob Suter Memorial Rink).

The Capitols began their first season back in the USHL on September 27, 2014, with a 4–3 loss at Muskegon. Luke McElhenie, a native of Sauk City, WI, scored the first goal in the new era of the Capitols. McElhenie previously played for Bob Suter and the Madison Capitols AAA program. Madison picked up its first victory in the USHL on October 24, defeating the Sioux Falls Stampede 3–1.

Following the 2014–15 season, Luke Strand left the organization to accept an assistant coaching position at the University of Wisconsin–Madison under head coach Mike Eaves.

On June 10, 2015, it was announced that Troy G. Ward had been hired as the new head coach and general manager. After one season, Troy Ward resigned his positions with the organization and was replaced as head coach and general manager by Garrett Suter.

On July 28, 2017, the Capitols announced that Andrew Joudrey was named the team's new president. That same day, the team announced plans to relocate from the Alliant Energy Center to Hartmeyer Ice Arena for the 2017–18 season. Reasons cited for the move included a decrease in available dates for hockey at the Alliant Energy Center and a desire on the Capitols' part for better sightlines and fan experience. Negotiations between the Capitols and Hartmeyer management over needed facility upgrades would come to an impasse, and on September 11, the Capitols announced they would instead play the 2017–18 season at Bob Suter's Capitol Ice Arena, a two-rink facility in suburban Middleton owned by Ryan Suter and named in father Bob Suter's memory. The Capitol Ice Arena, already a practice site for the Capitols, had a capacity of 1,300 fans for hockey, and became the smallest arena in the USHL. In the 2018 off-season, the Capitols renovated the rink to increase the capacity and add more suites. Head coach and general manager Garrett Suter stepped down after the 2019–20 season.

Due to the on-going restrictions related to the COVID-19 pandemic, the Capitols went on hiatus for the 2020–21 season. The Capitols resumed play for the 2021–22 season.

Season-by-season record

Personnel

Active roster
As of December 24, 2022.

|}

Notable alumni
Derek Plante, 1989–90
Brian Rafalski, 1990–91

NHL draft picks

Awards and player recognition 
Joe Harwell - 1988-89 All-USHL 1st Team
Ryan Edquist – 2015–16 USHL All-Rookie Team
Sam McCormick - 2015-16 All-USHL 3rd Team
Michael Mancinelli – 2017–18 USHL All-Rookie Team
Mick Messner – 2016 U.S. Junior Select Team 
Ryan O'Reilly – 2017–18 USHL All-Rookie Team, 2018 U.S. Junior Select Team
Scott Owens – USHL General Manager of the Year, 1986–87
Scott Owens – USHL Coach of the Year, 1987–88
Simon Latkoczy - 2019-20 USHL All-Rookie Team
Ryan Kirwan - 2019-20 USHL All-Rookie Team
Christian Stoever - 2019-20 All-USHL 3rd Team

Prospects games participants
Ryan Edquist – 2015 CCM/USA Hockey All-American Prospects Game, 2016 USHL/NHL Top Prospects Game
Mick Messner – 2016 CCM/USA Hockey All-American Prospects Game, 2017 USHL/NHL Top Prospects Game
Ryan O'Reilly – 2017 CCM/USA Hockey All-American Prospects Game, 2018 USHL/NHL Top Prospects Game
Kamil Sadlocha – 2017 USHL/NHL Top Prospects Game
Carson Bantle – 2020 USA Hockey BioSteel All American Game

References

External links 
 

United States Hockey League teams
Ice hockey teams in Wisconsin
Ice hockey clubs established in 2014
2014 establishments in Wisconsin
Middleton, Wisconsin
Sports in Madison, Wisconsin